The Indian Institute of Management Nagpur also known as IIM Nagpur or IIMN is a public sector business school located in Nagpur, Maharashtra, India.

Indian Institute of Management Nagpur (IIMN) was the first among the six new-generation IIMs established by the Government of India in 2015 to begin its operations. Honourable President of India Mr. Ram Nath Kovind inaugurated the institute’s 132-acre campus on May 8.

In July 2022, IIM Nagpur along with the UNICEF launched an initiative programme to educate and train underprivileged children.

Students of IIMN have visited Japan, France, UAE, South Korea and Singapore as part of this optional module.

Placements 
The campus recruitment process at IIM Nagpur is headed by the Career Development Services (CDS) office. Some recruiters include Deloitte Consulting, Amazon, ThyssenKrupp, Mu Sigma, Tata Power, DHL, Genpact, ANZ Bank, Hexaware Technologies, Tech Mahindra, Wipro Digital, TVS Motors, V Guard, Kotak Mahindra, HCL Technologies, L & T, and Sutherland Global.
InFED has incubated nine women entrepreneurs under the Women Startup Programme (WSP), being conducted in collaboration with NSRCEL, IIM Bangalore. This programme is supported by Goldman Sachs and Department of Science & Technology, Government of India.  The women entrepreneurs, currently being incubated by IIM Nagpur, are working in different sectors such as adventure sports, astronomy education, textile design, customized pet foods, food search & discovery service, finance, health & sanitation, and civic society. These incubates are being provided with a monthly stipend, one-time prototyping grant, mentoring and review and multiple opportunities to network, in addition to space for setting up their offices.

IIM Nagpur has secured the 40th rank in the Management Category of educational institutes in the NIRF rankings 2020.

See also 
 Indian Institutes of Management
 Indian Institute of Management Ahmedabad

References

External links 
 IIM Nagpur

Business schools in Maharashtra
 
Universities and colleges in Nagpur
Educational institutions established in 2015
2015 establishments in Maharashtra